The 2008 Hansol Korea Open was a women's tennis tournament played on outdoor hard courts. It was the 5th edition of the event known that year as the Hansol Korea Open, and was part of the Tier IV Series of the 2008 WTA Tour. It took place at the Seoul Olympic Park Tennis Center in Seoul, South Korea, from September 22 through September 28, 2008.

Finals

Singles

 Maria Kirilenko defeated  Samantha Stosur, 2–6, 6–1, 6–4
 It was Kirilenko's 3rd title of the year, and her 5th overall.

Doubles

 Chuang Chia-jung /  Hsieh Su-wei defeated  Vera Dushevina /  Maria Kirilenko, 6–3, 6–0

External links
Official website 
Singles, Doubles, and Qualifying Singles draws

Hansol Korea Open
Korea Open (tennis)
Korea